Oostende can mean:

 Ostend, a city in Belgium
 Oostende, Netherlands, a drowned village in Zeeland, Netherlands
 AS Ostende, a Belgian football club
 B.C. Oostende, a Belgian professional basketball team

See also
 
 Ostend (disambiguation)
 Ostende (disambiguation)
 Oosteinde, a village in North Holland
 Oosterend, North Holland